Saint-Marien is a commune in the Creuse department in central France.

Population

See also
Communes of the Creuse department

References

Communes of Creuse